Ocellularia cloonanii is a species of corticolous lichen in the family Graphidaceae. Found in Sri Lanka, it was formally described as a new species in 2014 by lichenologists Gothamie Weerakoon, Robert Lücking, and Helge Thorsten Lumbsch. The lichen is only known to occur at the type locality in the Horton Plains. The specific epithet cloonanii honours Colman Patrick Cloonan, "for his immense help in carrying out the research studies". Its ascospores are hyaline, ellipsoid in shape, contain seven to nine septa, and measure 35–40 by 7–10 μm. Secondary chemicals present in the lichen include psoromic acid, subpsoromic acid, and 2’-O-demethylpsoromic acid.

See also
 List of Ocellularia species

References

cloonanii
Lichen species
Lichens of Sri Lanka
Lichens described in 2014
Taxa named by Helge Thorsten Lumbsch
Taxa named by Robert Lücking
Taxa named by Gothamie Weerakoon